This is a wide-ranging alphabetical list of philosophers from the Eastern traditions of philosophy, with special interest in Indo-Chinese philosophy. The list stops at the year 1950, after which philosophers fall into the category of contemporary philosophy.

Chinese philosophers

Ancient Chinese philosophers

Before 256 BCE (until the end of the Zhou dynasty)
 Guan Zhong (died in 645 BCE)
 Confucius (traditionally 551–479 BCE) — founder of Confucianism
 Sunzi (– BCE) — military philosopher
 Laozi (probably 6th century BCE) — founder of Taoism

475–221 BCE (Warring States period)
 Mozi (– BCE) — political and religious philosopher
 Liezi (– BCE)
 Gaozi ( BCE)
 Mencius (most accepted dates: 372–289 BCE; other possible dates: 385–303 BCE or 302 BCE) — political philosopher, social contract
 Xu Xing ( BCE)
 Gongsun Longzi (fl. 300 BCE) — School of Names
 Hui Shi (4th century BCE)—School of Names
 Shang Yang (died 338 BCE) — Legalist bureaucrat
 Shen Buhai (died 337 BCE) — Legalist bureaucrat
 Shen Dao (–275 BCE)
 Song Xing (360–290 BCE)
 Yang Zhu (370–319 BCE)— Usually classified as a Hedonist
 Zhuang Zhou (Zhuangzi,  BCE) — major Taoist philosopher
 Xunzi (–237 BCE) — Confucianist, pessimistic about human nature
 Zou Yan (305?–240? BCE)— School of Naturalists, Yin-Yang, Five Elements
 Han Feizi (died 233 BCE) — totalistic legalism
 Lü Buwei (290–235 BCE)

221 BCE–220 CE (Qin, Han and Xin dynasties)
 Jia Yi (201–169 BCE)
 Dong Zhongshu (– BCE)
 Liu An (179–122 BCE)
 Wang Chong (27–97 CE)
 Yang Xiong (53 BCE–18 CE)
 Zheng Xuan (127–200 CE)
 He Yan (190–249 CE)

220 CE–907 CE (Three Kingdoms period to Tang dynasty)
 Ruan Ji (210–263)
 Ji Kang (223–262)
 Wang Bi (226–249) — commentator on the Tao Te Ching and the I Ching
 Pei Wei (267–300)
 Guo Xiang (died 312)
 Zhi Dun (314–366)
 Sengzhao (384–414)
 Ge Hong (4th century)
 Zhiyi (538–597)
 Jizang (549–623)
 Cheng Xuanying (631–655)
 Huineng (638–713)
 Fazang (643–712)
 Li Ao (722–841)
 Han Yu (768–824)
 Zongmi (780–841)
 Linji Yixuan (died 866)

907–1368 (Five Dynasties and Ten Kingdoms period to Yuan dynasty)
 Fan Zhongyan (989–1052)
 Hu Yuan (993–1059) — revived Confucianism
 Shao Yung (1011–1077)
 Zhou Dunyi (1017–1073)
 Chang Tsai (1020–1077)
 Cheng Hao (1032–1085) — established the Confucian "School of Mind"
 Cheng Yi (1033–1107)
 Hu Hong (1105-1161)
 Zhu Xi (1130–1200) — thinker of the Confucianist "School of Principle"
 Lu Jiuyuan (1139–1193)

1368–1912 (Ming and Qing dynasties)
 Chen Xianzhang (1428–1500)
 Wang Yangming (1472–1529)
 Wang Gen (1483-1541)
 He Xinyin (1517-1579)
 Li Zhi (1527–1602)
 Jiao Hong (1540–1620)
 Liu Tsung-chou (1578–1645)
 Huang Zongxi (1610–1695)
 Wang Fuzhi (1619–1692)
 Yen Yuan (1635–1704)
 Li Gong (1659–1733)
 Dai Zhen (1724–1777)
 Zhang Xuecheng (1738–1801)
 Yu Zhengxie (1775–1840) — prominent scholar and male feminist, philosopher, philologist, astrologer
 Kang Youwei (1858–1927)
 Tan Sitong (1864–1898)
 Sun Yat-sen (1866–1925)
 Liang Qichao (1873–1929)
 He Zhen (1884–1920)

Modern Chinese philosophers

1912–1950 
 Ch'ien Mu (1895–1990)
 Thomé H. Fang (1899–1976)
 Feng Youlan (1895–1990)
 Xiong Shili (1885–1968)
 Xu Fuguan (1903–1982)
 Hu Shih (1891–1962)
 Liang Shuming (1893–1988)
 Zhang Dongsun (1886–1973)
 Liu Shaoqi (1898–1969)
 Mao Zedong (1893–1976)
 Mou Tsung-san (1909–1995)
 T'ang Chun-i (1909–1978)
 Hao Wang (1921–1995)

Indian philosophers

Ancient Indian philosophers

Early Vedic age 1500-800 BCE (Saptarishi)
 Vasishtha
 Atri
 Vishvamitra
 Agastya
 Gautama Maharishi
 Jamadagni
 Bharadwaja
 Dirghatamas, famous for his monistic views
 Lopamudra, the earliest female philosopher

Late Vedic age 800–400 BCE (Sectarianism)
 Parshvanatha Parshvanatha(between 872 and 772 BCEParshvanatha) is the earliest Jain tirthankara who is generally acknowledged as a historical figure.
 Aruni (between 750 and 650 BCE) credited with laying the foundation of Indian atomism
 Yajnavalkya (between 700 and 600 BCE) credited for coining Advaita (non-dual, monism), an important tradition within Hinduism
 Makkhali Gosala (between 600 and 500 BCE) – founder Ājīvika philosophy
 Pāṇini (between 600 and 500 BCE) – made contributions to Philosophy of language and Sanskrit grammar
 Siddhartha Gautama (–483 BCE) – founder of Buddhism
 Mahākāśyapa – Most Venerable Mahā Kāshyapa Maha Thero
 Bṛhaspati – Founder of Cārvāka philosophy
 Mahavira (599–527 BCE) – heavily influenced Jainism, the 24th Tirthankara of Jainism
 Badarayana (lived between 500 BCE and 400 BCE) – Author of Brahma Sutras
 Kapila ( BCE) founder of Sankhya philosophy

321–184 BCE (Maurya Empire)
 Shvetashvatara – Author of earliest textual exposition of a systematic philosophy of Shaivism
 Chanakya (–275 BCE) – A pioneer in the field of economics and political science
 Jaimini (–200 BCE) – Author of Purva Mimamsa Sutras
 Aksapada Gautama ( BCE) – founder of Nyaya philosophy
 Kanada – founder of Vaisheshika
 Pingala – Renowned for his work on Combinatorics and Sanskrit prosody

184 BCE–100 CE (Early Middle Kingdoms Begin—The Golden Age)
 Patanjali – Author of Yoga Sutra and a commentary on Panini
 Thiruvalluvar ( BCE–2nd century CE), best known for authoring the Tirukkuṛaḷ, a collection of couplets on ethics

100–300 (Cholas, Cheras, Pandavas and Kushan Empire)
 Nagarjuna (–250) – founder of Madhyamaka Buddhism
 Kundakunda, exponent of Jain mysticism and Jain nayas
 Umāsvāti or Umasvami, author of first Jain work in Sanskrit Tattvārthasūtra

300–550 (Gupta Empire)
 Vasubandhu – one of the main founders of the Yogacara school
 Asanga – one of the main founders of the Yogacara school
 Bodhidharma – founder of Zen Buddhism
 Vatsyayana – author of commentary on Nyāya Sūtras and Kama Sutra
 Bhartrhari (450–510) – contributed to linguistic theory
 Buddhaghosa
 Siddhasena Divākara – Jain logician and author of important works in Sanskrit and Prakrit
 Dignāga – one of the Buddhist founders of Indian logic
 Śīlabhadra He is best known as being an abbot of Nālandā monastery in India, as being an expert on Yogācāra teachings, and for being the personal tutor of the Chinese Buddhist monk Xuanzang.
 Udyotakara Udyotakara() – Nyaya Philosopher

600–900 (Late Middle Kingdoms—The Classical Age)
 Candrakirti (born ) – Madhyamaka Buddhist
 Kumārila Bhaṭṭa – Mimansa Philosopher
 Udyanacharya – Nyaya Philosopher
 Prabhākara – Grammarian and Mimansa Philosopher
 Dharmakirti
 Gaudapadacharya – Advaita Philosopher
 Adi Shankara – Advaita Vedanta school
 Anandavardhana – Philosopher of Aesthetics
 Vasugupta (860–925) – Author of Shiva Sutras
 Vācaspati Miśra – Nyaya Philosopher
 Jayanta Bhatta – Nyaya Philosopher

900–1100 (The Islamic Sultanates)
 Abhinavagupta (–1025)
 Atiśa (–1054) He was one of the major figures in the spread of Mahayana and Vajrayana Buddhism in Asia and inspired Buddhist thought from Tibet to Sumatra
 Udayana he was a very important Hindu logician who attempted to reconcile the views held by the two major schools of logic (Nyaya and Vaisheshika).
 Ramanuja (–1137) – founder of Vishishtadvaita or Qualified Non-dualism

1100–1500 (Vijaynagara Empire and Delhi Sultanate)
 Gorakshanath (11th- to 12th-centuries)
 Basaveshwara (1134–1196) – founder of Lingayatism
 Shri Madhvacharya (1238–1317)
 Gangeśa Upādhyāya
 Nimbarka
 Mādhava Vidyāranya
 Kabir (1440–1518)
 Vyasatirtha (–1539)
 Raghunatha Siromani (–1547) — founder of Navya Nyāya philosophy
 Vallabhacharya (–1531)
 Chaitanya Mahaprabhu (–1534)
 Ravidas (1450–1520)

1500–1800 (Mughal Empire, Rajput Kingdoms and Marahtha Confederacy Era)
 Mirabai (1498–1557) Bhakti saint & devotee of Krishna
 Nanak (–1539) – Bhakti Philosopher, Founder of Sikhism
Bhai gurdas :foundation sikh philosophy ,Indian six school interpretation 
 Madhusūdana Sarasvatī (–1640)
 Vijñānabhikṣu (–1600) – synthesized Vedānta, Sāṃkhya, and Yoga into avibhagādvaita ("indistinguishable non-dualism")
 Gadadhara Bhattacharya (17th century) – Nyaya philosopher

Modern Indian philosophers

1800–1947 (Colonial and Postcolonial Era)
 Devendranath Tagore (1817–1905)
 Dayananda Saraswati (1824–1883) founder of arya samaj
 Sai Baba (1835–1918)
 Ramakrishna Paramahamsa (1836–1886)
 Swami Vivekananda (1863–1902)
 Krishna Chandra Bhattacharya (1875–1949) Phenomenology
 Narayana Guru (1856–1928)
 Rabindranath Tagore (1861–1941)
 Brajendranath Seal (1864–1938)
 Mahatma Gandhi (1869–1948)
 Sri Aurobindo (1872–1950)
 Allama Iqbal (1877–1938)
 Ramana Maharshi (1879–1950)
 Nigamananda (1880–1935)
 Gopinath Kaviraj (1887–1976)
 Sarvepalli Radhakrishnan (1888–1975)
 Nolini Kanta Gupta (1889–1983)
 Bhimrao Ramji Ambedkar (1891–1956)
 Jiddu Krishnamurti (1895–1986)
 A. C. Bhaktivedanta (1896–1977) — founder/acharya of ISKCON (Hare Krishna movement)
 Nisargadatta Maharaj (1897–1981)
 Haridas Chaudhuri (1913–1975)
 Deendayal Upadhyaya (1916–1968) 
 U. G. Krishnamurti (1918–2007)
 Ram Swarup (1920–1998)
 Prabhat Ranjan Sarkar (1921–1990)
 Sita Ram Goel (1921–2003)
 Swami Krishnananda (1922–2001)
 Jitendra Nath Mohanty(1928-)
 Osho (1931–1990)
 Amartya Sen (born 1933)
 Bimal Krishna Matilal (1935–1991)
 Pandurang Shastri Athavale (1920–2003)

Japanese philosophers

Ancient Japanese philosophers

Until 1185 CE (until the end of the Heian period)
 Kūkai (774–835)
 Hōnen (1133–1212)

1185–1333 (Kamakura period)
 Shinran (1173–1261)
 Dōgen Zenji (1200–1253)
 Nichiren (1222–1282)

1333–1867 (Muromachi period to Edo period)
 Zeami Motokiyo (–)
 Fujiwara Seika (1561–1619)
 Miyamoto Musashi (1584–1645)
 Kumazawa Banzan (1619–1691)
 Itō Jinsai (1627–1705)
 Kaibara Ekken (1630–1714)
 Ogyū Sorai (1666–1728)
 Hakuin Ekaku (1686–1769)
 Tominaga Nakamoto (1715–1746)
 Motoori Norinaga (1730–1801)
 Nishi Amane (1829–1897)

Modern Japanese philosophers

1867–1950
 Nishida Kitaro (1870–1945)
 D. T. Suzuki (1870–1966)
 Tanabe Hajime (1885–1962)
 Kuki Shūzō (1888–1941)
 Watsuji Tetsuro (1889–1960)
 Sakurazawa Yukikazu (George Ohsawa) (1893–1966)
 Miki Kiyoshi (1897–1945)
 Josei Toda (1900–1958)
 Nishitani Keiji (1900–1990)
 Daisaku Ikeda (1928–)

Korean philosophers

Ancient Korean philosophers

Until 676 CE (until the end of the Three Kingdoms period)
 Seungrang

676–935 (Unified Silla period)
 Woncheuk (613–696)
 Wonhyo (617–686)
 Uisang (625–702)
 Doseon (827–898)
 Choi Chi-won (born 857)

935–1392 (Goryeo period)
 Uicheon (1055–1101)
 Jinul (1158–1210)

1392–1910 (Joseon period)
 Jeong Do-jeon (1342–1398)
 Seo Gyeong-deok (1489–1546)
 Yi Eon-jeok (1491–1553)
 Jo Sik (1501–1572)
 Yi Hwang (1501–1570)
 Yi I (1536–1584)
 Jeong Je-du (1649–1736)
 Yi Gan (1677–1727)
 Namdang (1682–1750)
 Jeong Yak-yong (1762–1836)
 Kim Jeong-hui (1786–1856)
 Choi Han-gi (1803–1879)
 Choi Je-u (1824–1864)
 Yi Je-ma (1838–1900)

Modern Korean philosophers

1910–1950
 Ryu Yeong-mo (1890–1981)
 Ham Seok-heon (1901–1989)

Tibetan philosophers
 Sakya Pandita (1182–1251)
 Rangjung Dorje (1284-1339)
 Dolpopa (Dol-bo-ba, 1292–1361)
 Longchenpa (1308–1364)
 Je Tsongkhapa (1357–1419)
 Gorampa (1429–1489)
 Sakya Chokden 1428–1507)
 Gyeltsap Darma Rinchen (1364–1432)
 Mikyö Dorje (1507–1554)
 Wangchuk Dorje (1556–1603)
 Jamyang Khyentse Wangpo (1820–1892)
 Jamgön Kongtrül (1813-1899)
 Jamgön Ju Mipham (1846–1912)

See also
 List of years in philosophy

References

External links
 Chinese Philosophy by Richard Hooker

Eastern philosophers